India is world's 3rd largest consumer of electricity and world's 3rd largest renewable energy producer with 40% of energy capacity installed in the year 2022 (160 GW of 400 GW) coming from renewable sources. Ernst & Young's (EY) 2021 Renewable Energy Country Attractiveness Index (RECAI) ranked India 3rd behind USA and China. In November 2021, India had a renewable energy capacity of 150 GW consisting of solar (48.55 GW), wind (40.03 GW), small hydro power (4.83 GW), bio-mass (10.62 GW), large hydro (46.51 GW), and nuclear (6.78 GW). India has committed for a goal of 500 GW renewable energy capacity by 2030.  

In 2016, Paris Agreement's Intended Nationally Determined Contributions targets, India made commitment of producing 50% of its total electricity from non-fossil fuel sources by 2030. In 2018, India's Central Electricity Authority set a target of producing 50% of the total electricity from non-fossil fuels sources by 2030. India has also set a target of producing 175 GW by 2022 and 500 GW by 2030 from renewable energy.

As of September 2020, 89.22 GW solar energy is already operational, projects of 48.21 GW are at various stages of implementation and projects of 25.64 GW capacity are under various stages of bidding. In 2020, 3 of the world's top 5 largest solar parks were in India including world's largest 2255 MW Bhadla Solar Park in Rajasthan and world's second-largest solar park of 2000 MW Pavgada Solar Park Tumkur in Karnataka and 1000 MW Kurnool in Andhra Pradesh. Wind power in India has a strong manufacturing base with 20 manufactures of 53 different wind turbine models of international quality up to 3 MW in size with exports to Europe, United States and other countries. 

Solar, wind and run-of-the-river hydroelectricity are environment-friendly cheaper power sources they are used as ""must-run" sources in India to cater for the base load, and the polluting and foreign-import dependent coal-fired power is increasingly being moved from the "must-run base load" power generation to the load following power generation (mid-priced and mid-merit on-demand need-based intermittently-produced electricity) to meet the peaking demand only. Some of the daily peak demand in India is already met with the renewable peaking hydro power capacity. Solar and wind power with 4-hour battery storage systems, as a source of dispatchable generation compared with new coal and new gas plants, is already cost-competitive in India without subsidy. 

India initiated the International Solar Alliance (ISA), an alliance of 121 countries. India was world's first country to set up a ministry of non-conventional energy resources (Ministry of New and Renewable Energy (MNRE) in early 1980s) . Solar Energy Corporation of India (SECI), a public sector undertaking, is responsible for the development of solar energy industry in India. Hydroelectricity is administered separately by the Ministry of Power and not included in MNRE targets.

Global comparison

Global rank 
India ranks second in terms of population and accounts for 17% of the world’s population. India is globally ranked 3rd in consumption of energy. In terms of installed capacity and investment in renewable energy, the EY's Renewable Energy Country Attractiveness Index (RECAI) ranking in July 2021 is as follows:

Attractiveness score 
The technology-specific RECAI scores (and rank) in 2021 are as follows:

Future targets 
The installed capacity of renewable power is 119.512 GW as of 30 November 2022. The government has announced that no new coal-based capacity addition is required beyond the 50 GW under different stages of construction likely to come online between 2017 and 2022.

Present installed capacity

Year-wise renewable energy generation trend 
Year wise renewable energy generation in TWh.

Grid-connected total including non-renewable and renewable 
The following table shows the breakdown of existing installed capacity in March 2020 from all sources, and includes 141.6 GW from renewable sources. Since 2019, the hydropower generated by the under Ministry of Power is also counted towards Ministry of New and Renewable Energy's Renewable Energy Purchase Obligation (REPO) targets, under which the DISCOMs (Distribution Companies) of various states have to source a certain percentage of their power from Renewable Energy Sources under two categories, Solar and Non-Solar.

Off-grid renewable energy installed capacity 

Off-grid power as of 31 July 2019 (MNRE) capacity:

Renewable electricity generation

Hydroelectric power 

India ranks 5th globally for installed hydroelectric power capacity. As of 31 March 2020, India's installed utility-scale hydroelectric capacity was 45,699 MW, or 12.35% of its total utility power generation capacity.

Additional smaller hydroelectric power units with a total capacity of 4,380 MW (1.3% of its total utility power generation capacity) have been installed. Small hydropower, defined to be generated at facilities with nameplate capacities up to 25 MW, comes under the ambit of the Ministry of New and Renewable energy (MNRE); while large hydro, defined as above 25 MW, comes under the ambit of the Ministry of Power.

India is endowed with vast potential of pumped hydroelectric energy storage which can be used economically for converting the non-dispatchable renewable energy like wind, solar and run of the river hydro power in to base/peak load power supply for its ultimate energy needs.

Solar power

India is densely populated and has high solar insolation, an ideal combination for using solar power in India. Announced in November 2009, the Government of India proposed to launch its Jawaharlal Nehru National Solar Mission under the National Action Plan on Climate Change. The program was inaugurated by former Prime Minister Manmohan Singh on 11 January 2010 with a target of 20GW grid capacity by 2022 as well as 2GW off-grid installations, this target was later increased to 100 GW by the same date under the Narendra Modi government in the 2015 Union budget of India. Achieving this National Solar Mission target would establish India in its ambition to be a global leader in solar power generation. The Mission aims to achieve grid parity (electricity delivered at the same cost and quality as that delivered on the grid) by 2022. The National Solar Mission is also promoted and known by its more colloquial name of "Solar India". The earlier objectives of the mission were to install 1,000 MW of power by 2013 and cover  with collectors by the end of the final phase of the mission in 2022.

On 30 November 2015, the Prime Minister of India Narendra Modi and the President of France Francois Hollande launched the International Solar Alliance. The ISA is an alliance of 121 solar rich countries lying partially or fully between the Tropic of Cancer and the Tropic of Capricorn, several countries outside of this area are also involved with the organization. The ISA aims to promote and develop solar power amongst its members and has the objective of mobilising $1 trillion of investment by 2030. As of August, 2019, the Indian Oil Corporation stated that it wants to invest ₹25,000 crore in renewable energy projects.

Much of the country does not have an electrical grid, so one of the first applications of solar power was for water pumping, to begin replacing India's forty to fifty lakh diesel powered water pumps, each consuming about 3.5 kilowatts, and off-grid lighting. Some large projects have been proposed, and a  area of the Thar Desert has been set aside for solar power projects, sufficient to generate 700 to 2,100 gigawatts.

As part of India's ambitious solar programme the central government has set up a US$350 million fund and the Yes Bank will loan US$5 billion to finance solar projects (c. January 2018). The bidding process for the addition of 115 GW to January 2018 renewable energy levels was completed by the end of 2019–2020. 

India is also the home to the world's first and only 100% solar-powered airport, located at Cochin, Kerala. India also has a wholly 100% solar-powered railway station in Guwhati, Assam.  India's first and the largest floating solar power plant was constructed at Banasura Sagar reservoir in Wayanad, Kerala.

The Indian Solar Loan Programme, supported by the United Nations Environment Programme has won the prestigious Energy Globe World award for Sustainability for helping to establish a consumer financing program for solar home power systems. Over three years more than 16,000 solar home systems have been financed through 2,000 bank branches, particularly in rural areas of South India where the electricity grid does not yet extend.

Launched in 2003, the Indian Solar Loan Programme was a four-year partnership between UNEP, the UNEP Risoe Centre, and two of India's largest banks, the Canara Bank and Syndicate Bank.

Nuclear power 

, India had 10 nuclear reactors under-construction with a combined capacity of 8 GW and 23 existing nuclear reactors in operation in 7 nuclear power plants with a total installed capacity of 7.4 GW (3.11% of total power generation in India). Nuclear power is the fifth-largest source of electricity in India after coal, hydroelectricity, solar, wind and gas power.

Bioenergy

Biomass 

India is an ideal environment for biomass production given its tropical location, sunshine and rains. The country's vast agricultural potential provides agro-residues which can be used to meet energy needs, both in heat and power applications. According to IREDA "Biomass is capable of supplementing the coal to the tune of about 26 crore (260 million) tonnes", "saving of about ₹25,0000 crore, every year." It is estimated that the potential for biomass energy in India includes 16,000 MW from biomass energy and a further 3,500 MW from bagasse cogeneration. Biomass materials that can be used for power generation include bagasse, rice husk, straw, cotton stalk, coconut shells, soya husk, de-oiled cakes, coffee waste, jute wastes, groundnut shells and sawdust.

Biogas

In 2018, India has set target to produce 1.5 crore (15 million) tons (62 mmcmd) of biogas/bio-CNG by installing 5,000 large scale commercial type biogas plants which can produce daily 12.5 tons of bio-CNG by each plant. The rejected organic solids from biogas plants can be used  after Torrefaction in the existing coal fired plants to reduce coal consumption.

The number of small family type biogas plants reached 3.98 million.

Bio protein

Synthetic methane (SNG) generated using electricity from carbon neutral renewable power or Bio CNG can be used to produce protein rich feed for cattle, poultry and fish economically by cultivating Methylococcus capsulatus bacteria culture with tiny land and water foot print. The carbon dioxide gas produced as by product from these bio protein plants can be  recycled in the generation of SNG. Similarly, oxygen gas produced as by product from the electrolysis of water and the methanation  process can be consumed in the cultivation of bacteria culture. With these integrated plants, the abundant renewable power potential in India can be converted in to high value food products without any water pollution or green house gas (GHG) emissions for achieving food security at a faster pace with lesser people deployment in agriculture / animal husbandry sector.

Waste to energy

Every year, about 5.5 crore (55 million) tonnes of municipal solid waste (MSW) and 3,800 crore (38 billion) litres of sewage are generated in the urban areas of India. In addition, large quantities of solid and liquid wastes are generated by industries. Waste generation in India is expected to increase rapidly in the future.  As more people migrate to urban areas and as incomes increase, consumption levels are likely to rise, as are rates of waste generation. It is estimated that the amount of waste generated in India will increase at a per capita rate of approximately 1–1.33% annually. 
This has significant impacts on the amount of land that is and will be needed for disposal, economic costs of collecting and transporting waste, and the environmental consequences of increased MSW generation levels.

India has had a long involvement with anaerobic digestion and biogas technologies. Waste water treatment plants in the country have been established which produce renewable energy from sewage gas. However, there is still significant untapped potential. 
Also wastes from the distillery sector are on some sites converted into biogas to run in a gas engine to generate onsite power. Prominent companies in the waste to energy sector include:
A2Z Group of companies
Hanjer Biotech Energies
Ramky Enviro Engineers Ltd
Arka BRENStech Pvt Ltd
 Hitachi Zosen India Pvt Limited
Clarke Energy
 ORS Group
Punjab Renewable Energy Systems Pvt. Ltd.

Biofuel

Ethanol 
India imports 85% of petrol products with import cost of $55 billion in 2020–21, India has set a target of blending 20% ethanol in petrol by 2025 resulting in import substitution saving of US$4 billion or ₹30,000 crore, and India provides financial assistance for manufacturing ethanol from rice, wheat, barley, corn, sorghum, sugarcane, sugar beet, etc.  Ethanol market penetration reached its highest figure of a 10% blend rate in India in 2022 and is currently on track to achieve 20% ethanol blending by 2025 as envisioned in National Policy on Biofuels. 

Ethanol is produced from sugarcane molasses and partly from grains and can be blended with gasoline. Sugarcane or sugarcane juice may not be used for the production of ethanol in India. Government is also encouraging 2G ethanol commercial production using biomass as feed stock.

Biodiesel 
The market for biodiesel remains at an early stage in India with the country achieving a minimal blend rate with diesel of 0.001% in 2016. Initially development was focussed on the jatropha (jatropha curcas) plant as the most suitable inedible oilseed for biodiesel production. Some Life Cycle Assessment (LCA) studies have shown India's potential for production of low carbon Jatropha and Algae based biodiesel .Development of biodiesel from jatropha has met a number of agronomic and economic restraints and attention is now moving towards other feedstock technologies which utilize used cooking oils, other unusable oil fractions, animal fat and inedible oils. Biodiesel and also Biopropane are produced from non-edible vegetable oils, used cooking oil, waste animal fats, etc.

Wind power

The development of wind power in India began in the 1990s, and has significantly increased in the last few years. Although a relative newcomer to the wind industry compared with Denmark or US, domestic policy support for wind power has led India to become the country with the fourth largest installed wind power capacity in the world.

As of 30 June 2018 the installed capacity of wind power in India was 34,293 MW, mainly spread across Tamil Nadu (7,269.50 MW), Maharashtra (4,100.40 MW), Gujarat (3,454.30 MW), Rajasthan (2,784.90 MW), Karnataka (2,318.20 MW), Andhra Pradesh (746.20 MW) and Madhya Pradesh (423.40 MW) Wind power accounts for 10% of India's total installed power capacity. India has set an ambitious target to generate 60,000 MW of electricity from wind power by 2022.

Wind power installations occupy only 2% of the wind farm area facilitating the rest of the area for agriculture, plantations, etc. The Indian Government's Ministry of New and Renewable Energy announced a new wind-solar hybrid policy in May 2018. This means that the same piece of land will be used to house both wind farms and solar panels.

Largest wind farms in India

See also

 Electricity sector in India
 Hydroelectric power in India
 International Renewable Energy Agency
 Renewable energy by country
 Bureau of Energy Efficiency
 Renewable energy in Asia
 Renewable energy commercialization
 Renewable energy debate
 Fossil fuel phase-out
 World energy resources and consumption
 Ministry of New and Renewable Energy
 Ocean thermal energy conversion
 List of countries by electricity production from renewable sources

References

External links
 India's National Power Portal and Dashboard
 India's Central Electricity Authority
 Renewable energy world magazine